The Pascagoula Central Fire Station No. 1, at 623 Delmas Ave. in Pascagoula, Mississippi, was built in 1924.  It was listed on the National Register of Historic Places in 1978.  It has also been known as the "Old Fire Station".

It was designed in 1919 by Mobile architect Charles Owen but was not built for several years.

Since 1982 Scranton's Restaurant has occupied the building.

References

Fire stations in Mississippi
National Register of Historic Places in Jackson County, Mississippi
Mission Revival architecture in Mississippi
Buildings and structures completed in 1924
Fire stations on the National Register of Historic Places